Abdera hoffeinsorum is an extinct  species of false darkling beetle in the genus Abdera. It was discovered in Baltic amber in 2014.

References

Melandryidae
Beetles described in 2014
Fossil taxa described in 2014